West Butte (formerly, Westbutte) is an unincorporated community in Sutter County, California,  north-northeast of Meridian.  It lies at an elevation of 85 feet (26 m). A post office operated at West Butte from 1863 to 1930.

References

Unincorporated communities in California
Unincorporated communities in Sutter County, California